Dalea albiflora, the whiteflower prairie clover or  scruffy prairie clover, is a perennial subshrub or herb of the subfamily Faboideae in the pea family-(Fabaceae). It is found in the southwestern United States and Northwestern Mexico in the states of Arizona, New Mexico, Sonora, and Chihuahua.

Whiteflower prairie clover is a low-lying subshrub with horizontal spreading gray-green pinnate leaves. The flowers are vertical with multiple inflorescences; both flowers and leaves are extremely oily and resinous, and leave perfume-like odors on any surface: hands, boots, etc.

Western Sonoran Desert specifics
In the western Sonoran Desert of southwest Arizona, scruffy prairie clover can be found throughout flatland mesas. It is also found in mountainous regions, for example the Muggins Mountains Wilderness on south and southwest facing ridgelines and flats.

References

External links
Photo-High Res--(Close-up of Flower, and pinnate leaf); Article - delange.org – "Arizona Wildflowers: cream to white"

albiflora
Flora of the Southwestern United States
North American desert flora
Flora of the Chihuahuan Desert
Flora of the Sonoran Deserts
Flora of Northwestern Mexico
Flora of Arizona
Flora of New Mexico
Flora of Sonora
Flora of Chihuahua (state)
Taxa named by Asa Gray